Salama ibn al-Akwaʿ was one of the companions of the Islamic prophet Muhammad.

Name
His full name is Salama ibn al-Akwaʿ al-Aslamī.

Legacy
He is one of the notable narrators of hadith. He is known for being an excellent athlete and a very fast runner, and it was said that he could run faster than a horse and that his shout could be heard over a distance of 5 miles.

Military expeditions

During Muhammad's era he was the commander in the Expedition of Dhu Qarad

See also
List of battles of Muhammad

References

Sahabah hadith narrators